Vintage Tech is compilation album released by rapper Tech N9ne. It brings together a mixture of unreleased material with material that was previously released on Compilations as well as from his earlier albums.

Track listing

Samples
Freaky
"Darling Nikki" by Prince
I'm A Playa
"Friends" by Whodini
"Rock Me Amadeus" by Falco
Lost Lair Of B'zle
"Ave Satani" by Jerry Goldsmith
S.H.E. (Seductive Human Erotica)
"Behind My Camel" by The Police
Now It's On
"Moments in Love" by Art Of Noise
Save Yourself
"God rest you merry, gentlemen"

References

Tech N9ne albums
2005 compilation albums